Record, sometimes referred as Record: The Best of Zero 7, is a compilation album by British musical duo Zero 7, released on 28 June 2010. The compilation contains material from the duo's first four studio albums. The deluxe version includes a second disc featuring remixes by such producers as J Dilla, Justus Köhncke and Joker.

Critical reception

Lily Moayeri of Under the Radar said the album "is all the Zero 7 anyone could ask for—all killer, no filler." Pitchfork Media's Jess Harvell wrote that "the best-of format actually works against Zero 7 by ignoring the non-singles that added, however rarely, some much-needed variety to their albums." Sachyn Mital of PopMatters suggested that the single-disc version is "passable for new listeners", while the deluxe version "might please longtime fans hoping to collect many remixes on one disc."

Track listing

References

External links
Zero 7 official website

Zero 7 compilation albums